Shashwat Sachdev is an Indian music composer and entrepreneur. He also won the 65th Filmfare R.D. Burman Award for best new and upcoming talent.

Early life
Sachdev was born in Jaipur. He started learning music when he was three years old, beginning with Hindustani classical vocals and rhythm. He then went on to train in the Western classical piano during his school days.

Career
Shashwat started his career in 2011 in Hollywood, Los Angeles working on numerous projects before moving to India in 2016.

In 2017, he was the music composer for Phillauri, which starred Anushka Sharma and Diljit Dosanjh.

In 2018, he composed four songs for Veere Di Wedding, a Bollywood female buddy comedy film, directed by Shashanka Ghosh. The film stars Kareena Kapoor Khan, Sonam Kapoor Ahuja, Swara Bhaskar and Shikha Talsania. He scored for Selection Day an Indian Netflix Original Sports web television series, based on Aravind Adiga's 2016 novel of the same name. Produced by Anil Kapoor and Anand Tucker.

In 2019 he composed the music as well as background score for Uri: The Surgical Strike, an Indian action film written and directed by debutant Aditya Dhar and produced by Ronnie Screwvala under his banner RSVP Movies starring Vicky Kaushal. The film is based on the 2016 Indian Army's surgical strikes on PoK in retaliation for the Uri attack. The film's music received rave reviews. His background score was also appreciated and released separately on popular demand. Shashwat won the award for Best Background Music in the 66th National Film Awards for Uri: The Surgical Strike. He won the 65th Filmfare R.D. Burman Award for best new and upcoming talent. Shashwat also won the 21st IIFA Award for best background score for Uri: The Surgical Strike.

He released a production album titled Euphoria And The Following Realties along with Extreme Music for which his track Dharma won Best World Production Music 2021 and Shashwat himself won PRS Foundation The Best Newcomer 2021 in the Production Music Awards 2021 held in London on 12 December 2021 that celebrate the best production music libraries and most talented composers from all over the world.

His next release was Attack an Indian Hindi-language superhero film directed and co-written by Lakshya Raj Anand.The film produced by Jayantilal Gada, John Abraham and Ajay Kapoor, stars John Abraham alongside Jacqueline Fernandez and Rakul Preet Singh.

Shashwat is now releasing independent music with, a new label called IndieA Records launched in India with the intention to nurture and promote independent artists backed by Universal Music India,  he dropped his first piece of music with them called “Awaara Ho.”

Discography

Films

Film Songs

Film Score Albums

Independent Work

Albums

Accolades

References

External links

Living people
Indian male composers
Year of birth missing (living people)
Best Background Score National Film Award winners